Maharashtri or Maharashtri Prakrit is a Prakrit language of ancient as well as medieval India.

Maharashtri Prakrit was commonly spoken until 875 CE and was the official language of the Satavahana dynasty. Works like Karpūramañjarī and Gaha Sattasai (150 BCE) were written in it. Jain Acharya Hemachandra is the grammarian of Maharashtri Prakrit. Maharashtri Prakrit was the most widely used Prakrit language in western and southern India.

History
The rise of the Prakrits is dated to the middle of the second millennium BCE when they existed alongside Vedic Sanskrit and later evolved into highly developed literary languages. It is a subject of scholarly debate as to whether Sanskrit or the Prakrits are older with some scholars contending that Sanskrit was born out of the Prakrits. According to the Sanskrit scholar, Rajaramshastri Bhagawat, Maharashtri is older and more vivacious than Sanskrit.

Vararuchi, the oldest known grammarian of Prakrit, devotes four chapters of his Prakrita-Prakasha to the grammar of Maharashtri Prakrit. The other popular Prakrits—Shauraseni, Ardhamagadhi, and Paishachi—merit only one each. This preeminence of Maharashtri is confirmed by Dandin who, in his Kavyadarsha, grants it the highest status among all Prakrits.

Demographics
Maharashtri is the most attested amongst all Prakrit languages. It was spoken from Malwa and Rajputana (north) to the Krishna River and Tungabhadra River region (south). Historians agree that Maharashtri and other Prakrit languages prevailed in what is now modern Maharashtra.
Maharashtri was widely spoken in Western India and even as far south as Kannada-speaking region.

Early literature
The Gaha Sattasai is attributed to King Hāla (r. 20-24 CE). Other Maharashtri Prakrit works include the Setubandha of Pravarasena II, Karpuramañjarī and SriHarivijay. The language was used by Vakpati to write the poem Gaudavaho. It is also used in the dialogue and songs of low-class characters in Sanskrit plays, especially the famous dramatist Kālidāsa.

Patronage
Maharashtri was the official language of the Satavahana dynasty in the early centuries of the Common Era. Under the patronage of the Satavahana Empire, Maharashtri became the most widespread Prakrit of its time, and also dominated the literary culture amongst the three "Dramatic" Prakrits of the time, Maharashtri, Shauraseni and Magadhi. A version of Maharashtri called Jaina Maharashtri was also employed to write Jain scripture.

See also
 Malvani Konkani

References

Languages of India
Marathi language
Cultural history of Maharashtra
Prakrit languages
Indo-Aryan languages